Brandon Gilbert Gonzáles (born May 24, 1984) is an American former professional boxer. As an amateur, he was the top rated U.S. middleweight. He is of  Mexican and African American heritage.

Amateur career
Gonzales began boxing at 19 as a U.S. National Team member and went to have an amateur record of 56-7. He won the 2004 Golden Gloves, was a Finalist at the 2005 U.S. National Championships and was ranked as America's No. 1 ranked light heavyweight amateur boxer. Slated for the US Olympic Team in 2004 he withdrew to begin his professional career in 2007.  While boxing as an amateur he worked as a janitor at Arco Arena.

Professional career
On January 29, 2010 Gonzales won a fight against veteran Dumont Welliver by T.K.O., the fight was on the undercard of ESPN's Friday Night Fights. He maintained an unblemished streak of 17 wins until his bout with Thomas Oosthuizen that resulted in a draw.

On October 28, 2011 he defeated Ossie Duran in the Main Event on Showtime's ShoBox at Bally's in Atlantic City, New Jersey.

In 2014 Gonzales signed a promotional agreement with Gary Shaw Productions. He suffered his first loss to James DeGale at Wembley Stadium on 31 May 2014 in an IBF final eliminator. This was Gonzales's final fight and he now runs a boxing and fitness gym in California.

Professional record

|- style="margin:0.5em auto; font-size:95%;"
|align="center" colspan=8|18 Wins (10 knockouts), 1 Loss (1 knockout), 1 Draw
|- style="margin:0.5em auto; font-size:95%;"
|align=center style="border-style: none none solid solid; background: #e3e3e3"|Res.
|align=center style="border-style: none none solid solid; background: #e3e3e3"|Record
|align=center style="border-style: none none solid solid; background: #e3e3e3"|Opponent
|align=center style="border-style: none none solid solid; background: #e3e3e3"|Type
|align=center style="border-style: none none solid solid; background: #e3e3e3"|Rd., Time
|align=center style="border-style: none none solid solid; background: #e3e3e3"|Date
|align=center style="border-style: none none solid solid; background: #e3e3e3"|Location
|align=center style="border-style: none none solid solid; background: #e3e3e3"|Notes
|- align=center
|Loss
|18–1-1
|align=left| James Degale
|TKO || 4(12) || May 31, 2014 || align=left| Wembley Stadium, Wembley, London
|align=left|
|-align=center
|Win || 18-0-1 ||align=left|Jonathan Nelson
|UD || 10(10) || November 16, 2013 || align=left|Citizens Business Bank Arena, Ontario, California
|align=left|
|-align=center
|style="background:#abcdef;"|Draw|| 17-0-1 ||align=left|Thomas Oosthuizen
|SD || 10(10) || June 29, 2013 || align=left|MGM Grand at Foxwoods Resort, Mashantucket, Connecticut
|align=left|
|-align=center
|Win || 17-0-0 ||align=left|Don Mouton
|UD || 8 (8) || January 11, 2013 || align=left|Pueblo Pavilion, Santa Fe, New Mexico
|align=left|
|-align=center
|Win || 16-0-0 ||align=left|Elie Augustama
|UD || 8 (8) || June 22, 2012 || align=left|Soboba Casino, San Jacinto, California
|align=left|
|-align=center
|Win || 15-0-0 ||align=left|Ossie Duran
|SD || 8 (8) || October 28, 2011 || align=left|Bally's Event Center, Atlantic City, New Jersey
|align=left|
|-align=center
|Win || 14-0-0 ||align=left|Lester González
|UD || 8 (8) || January 7, 2011 || align=left|Allan Witt Sports Center, Fairfield, California
|align=left|
|-align=center
|Win || 13-0-0 ||align=left|Byron Tyson
|TKO || 3 , (1:31) || August 28, 2010 || align=left|Churchill Park, Fallon, Nevada
|align=left|
|-align=center
|Win || 12-0-0 ||align=left|Isiah McFadden
|UD || 6 (6) || May 22, 2010 || align=left|Grand Sierra Resort, Reno, Nevada
|align=left|
|-align=center
|Win || 11-0-0 ||align=left|Darnell Boone
|UD || 8 (8) || March 19, 2010 || align=left|Grand Sierra Resort, Reno, Nevada
|align=left|
|-align=center
|Win || 10-0-0 ||align=left|Dumont Welliver
|TKO || 2 , (1:25) || January 29, 2010 || align=left|Grand Sierra Resort, Reno, Nevada
|align=left|
|-align=center
|Win  || 9-0-0 ||align=left|Victor Villereal
|TKO || 4 , (2:55) || December 11, 2009 || align=left|Grand Sierra Resort, Reno, Nevada
|align=left|
|-align=center
|Win || 8-0-0 ||align=left|Ray Craig
|KO || 1 , (2:32) || May 21, 2009 || align=left|ARCO Arena, Sacramento, California
|align=left|
|-align=center
|Win || 7-0-0 ||align=left|Jason Dietrich
|TKO || 3 , (0:15) || January 29, 2009 || align=left|Red Lion Hotel, Sacramento, California
|align=left|
|-align=center
|Win  || 6-0-0 ||align=left|Andy Mavros
|UD || 6 (6) || January 9, 2009 || align=left|Buffalo Bill's Star Arena, Primm, Nevada
|align=left|
|-align=center
|style="background: #DDDDDD"|NC || 5-0-0 ||align=left|Daniel Stanislavjevic 
|NC || 1 (1:30) || September 26, 2008 || align=left|Morongo Casino Resort, Cabazon, California
|align=left|
|-align=center
|Win || 5-0-0 ||align=left|Billy Bailey
|KO || 6 , (0:40) || July 31, 2008 || align=left|Red Lion Hotel, Sacramento, California
|align=left|
|-align=center
|Win || 4-0-0 ||align=left|Mike Alexander
|TKO || 2 , (2:05) || May 15, 2008 || align=left|Red Lion Hotel, Sacramento, California
|align=left|
|-align=center
|Win || 3-0-0 ||align=left|Flavio Cardoza
|KO || 1 , (0:22) || February 27, 2008 || align=left|Red Lion Hotel, Sacramento, California
|align=left|
|-align=center
|Win || 2-0-0 || align=left|Angel Polanco
|KO || 1 , (2:08) || August 11, 2007 || align=left|ARCO Arena, Sacramento, California
|align=left|
|-align=center
|Win || 1-0-0 || align=left|Yonas Gebreegziabher
|TKO || 1 , (2:50) || February 22, 2007 || align=left|Radisson Hotel, Sacramento, California
|align=left|
|-align=center

References

External links

American boxers of Mexican descent
Middleweight boxers
1984 births
Living people
Boxers from Portland, Oregon
American male boxers
African Americans in Oregon
Janitors